Stone by Stone may refer to:
 Stone by Stone (album), a 2006 album by Floater
 "Stone by Stone" (song), a 2001 song by Catatonia